André Chastel (15 November 1912, Paris – 18 July 1990, Neuilly-sur-Seine) was a French art historian, author of an important work on the Italian Renaissance.

He was a professor at the Collège de France, where he held the chair of art and civilisation of the Renaissance in Italy, from 1970 to 1984, he was elected a member of the Académie des inscriptions et belles-lettres in 1975. He is buried at Ivry Cemetery, Ivry-sur-Seine.

Publications
Florentine Drawings, Hyperion, 1950
Léonard de Vinci par lui-même, Édit. Nagel, 1952
Marsile Ficin et l'art, Droz, Genève, 1954
L'Art italien, 1956 (reprinted: 1982, 1989, 1995; Italian translation: 1957–1958, English translation: 1963)
Botticelli, Silvana, Milan, 1957
Art et Humanisme à Florence au temps de Laurent le Magnifique, P.U.F, 1959, 1961, 1982
L'Âge de l'humanisme (with Robert Klein), Éditions de la connaissance, Bruxelles, 1963
Le Grand Atelier d'Italie, 1460-1500, Gallimard, 1965
Renaissance méridionale, 1460-1500, Gallimard, 1965
Le Mythe de la Renaissance, 1420-1520, Skira, Genève, 1969
La Crise de la Renaissance, 1520-1600, Skira, Genève, 1969
Fables, formes, figures (2 volumes), Flammarion, 1978
L'image dans le miroir, Gallimard, 1980
Grotesque, l'Arpenteur, 1980
Chronique de la peinture italienne à la Renaissance, 1250-1580, 1983
Le sac de Rome, Gallimard, 1984
L'Illustre Incomprise, Mona Lisa, Gallimard, 1988
Histoire de l'art français, 4 volumes, 1992-1996
La Pala ou le Retable italien des origines à 1500, 1993
La gloire de Raphaël ou le triomphe d'Éros, RMN, 1995
Giorgio Vasari, les Vies des meilleurs peintres sculpteurs et architectes, French translation of Lives of the Artists with notes, edited by André Chastel, Paris, Berger-Levrault, "Arts" collection, 12 vol., 1981–1989. Reissued, Actes Sud, "Thesaurus" collection, 2 vol., 2005.

External links
  Centre André Chastel - official site
 Entry on Chastel in the Dictionary of Art historians

French art historians
1912 births
1990 deaths
Academic staff of the Collège de France
Members of the Académie des Inscriptions et Belles-Lettres
20th-century French historians
20th-century French writers
20th-century French male writers
French male non-fiction writers
Corresponding Fellows of the British Academy
Burials at Ivry Cemetery